Gottardo Scotti (active 1457 – 1481) was an Italian painter of the Renaissance period.

Biography
He was born in Piacenza, but active in Milan. In 1457, along with Cristoforo da Monza he made estimates for a Maesta painted by Ambrogio Zavattari for the Milan Cathedral. In 1481, he was a member of the guild of painters and active in the Cathedral and Castle. In the Museo Poldi Pezzoli, a triptych is attributed to Gottardo depicting a Virgin of the Misericordia, an Annunciation, an Adoration of the Magi, St Sebastain and a holy bishop.

His son, Bernardo Scotti, painted in Cassino for the Maresciallo Trivulzio. Bernardo painted frescoes for the apse of the church of Cassino Scanasio.

Four other painters of the name Scotti were active in Lombardy during the 15th century: Melchiorre Scotti of Piacenza was active between 1430 and 1454 in the Duomo of Milan; Giorgio Scotti active in Como circa 1464; a Stefano Scotti was a master of Gaudenzio Ferrari; and a Felice Scotti painted glass in Como and in the church of Santa Croce in Boscaglia near Como.

References

15th-century Italian painters
Italian male painters
People from Piacenza
Painters from Milan
Italian Renaissance painters
Year of death unknown
Year of birth unknown